Daniel Richard (19 April 1944 – 12 January 2023) was a French entrepreneur.

Biography
Born in Bagnols-sur-Cèze on 19 April 1944, Richard's mother died when he was three years old. The grandson of a polytechnician, he attended the École nationale de l'aviation civile from 1964 to 1966 and earned a degree in engineering.

At the age of 25, Richard began working for the firm Bossard Consultant. He was later hired by 3 Suisses, which he led ten years later. In 1997, LVMH appointed him manager of Sephora, succeeding Dominique Mandonnaud. He was elected CEO of Nova Press in 2007, replacing Jean-François Bizot, who had passed away.

In 2009, Richard took over the clothing brand Souleiado with his son, Stéphane. In 2018, the two had a dispute and Stéphane sued his father. He felt "betrayed" by his son and appealed to the Court of Cassation.

Philanthropy
In 2001, Richard succeeded Luc Hoffmann as president of the World Wide Fund for Nature - . He was succeeded by Claude Dumont in 2008. During his mandate, the  brought together more than 80 NGOs for the Grenelle Environnement in 2005. That same year, he launched a blood analysis campaign with volunteers in Nîmes, though no results were published.

Politics
In February 2009, Richard founded the environmental and citizens movement, Résistances, with Victor Hugo Espinoza. That year, he announced his candidacy for the European election in Île-de-France. In 2020, he announced his candidacy for the municipal council of Nîmes with support from Europe Ecology – The Greens and the Socialist Party, the Radical Party of the Left, La France Insoumise, Ecology Generation, and Cap21. He joined Yvan Lachaud of The Centrists in the party list, a move unpopular with voters, leading him to finish with only 18.62% of votes in the second round.

Death
Daniel Richard died in Montpellier on 12 January 2023, at the age of 78.

Honors
Knight of the Legion of Honour (1997)

References

1944 births
2023 deaths
20th-century French businesspeople
21st-century French businesspeople
People from Bagnols-sur-Cèze
Chevaliers of the Légion d'honneur